Harold John Breau (5 June 1916 - 26 March 1977), known professionally as Hal Lone Pine, was an American-Canadian country singer. Born in Pea Cove, Maine in 1916, Lone Pine married French Canadian wife Betty Cody in 1938, with whom he performed. The pair moved in New Brunswick and eventually Winnipeg, where he performed a regular CKY radio show, and scored hit singles including 'It’s Goodbye And So Long To You’ and ‘The Trail Of The Lonesome Pine’. In Canada, Lone Pine is also known for writing two songs for Wilf Carter, 'When It’s Apple Blossom Time In Annapolis Valley’ and ‘Prince Edward Island Is Heaven To Me’. Lone Pine is the father of jazz guitarist Lenny Breau. He died in Maine in 1977. He was inducted into the Maine Country Music Hall of Fame.

References 

Musicians from New Brunswick
Musicians from Maine
1916 births
1977 deaths
American country musicians
Canadian country musicians
People from Old Town, Maine